Washburn Lake is a  lake located about three miles northwest of Outing, Minnesota in Cass County, Minnesota, USA. The lake occupies three distinct basins. A public access is co-located at the Clinton Converse DNR Forestry Campground at the south end of the eastern basin. Based on 2009 data, development is considered moderate, with 17.2 homes/cabins per shoreline mile. Shallow water substrates consist primarily of sand and gravel, although areas of rubble, boulders and muck are also present. The aquatic plant community is quite diverse and is critical to maintaining healthy fish populations. Emergent plants such as bulrush are common along much of the shoreline, however just as common are numerous gaps in these beds along shorelines with developed lots. The remaining emergent plants should be protected as they are important for shoreline protection, maintaining water quality, and providing essential spawning habitat for bass and panfish species. Submerged plants provide food and cover needed by fish and other aquatic species.

Washburn Lake was named for an early lumberman.

References

External links
 Lake Washburn contour map, fishnbudz

Lakes of Minnesota
Lakes of Cass County, Minnesota